WKNE (103.7 FM, "103.7 KNE-FM") is a radio station licensed to serve Keene, New Hampshire.  The station is owned by Saga Communications (which operates it as part of its Monadnock Radio Group) and licensed to Saga Communications of New England, LLC.  It airs a hot adult contemporary music format. WKNE transmits in HD Digital.

The station has been assigned the WKNE call sign by the Federal Communications Commission since January 21, 2003. Prior to that it held the WKNE-FM call sign since May 1985 (and prior to 1974), and WNBX-FM from 1974 to 1985.

In December 2018, WKNE's HD2 subchannel relaunched as soft adult contemporary, branded as "EZ Favorites 100.3/107.5" and simulcast over WKVT-HD2/100.3 W262CL (meanwhile, the WRSI simulcast moved to WSNI's HD2 subchannel) and the classic country "WINK Classic Country 103.1 FM" service that had been airing over WKNE's HD3 subchannel was moved to WINQ-FM's HD2 subchannel so that a new oldies format, branded as "Pure Oldies 104.1", could debut on WKNE's HD3 subchannel (simulcast on translator W281AU 104.1 FM Keene).

Translators
WKNE used to be heard on translators W227AW in Peterborough and W255BQ in Claremont. Recently, however, Saga moved the translators into Keene proper and repurposed them to relay the HD2 and HD3 streams of WKNE within the city.

 W255BQ is now W298BT 107.5 Keene, which, after having relayed WKBK for a while, has been relaying WKNE-HD2, since December 2018.
 W227AW is now W281AU 104.1 Keene, which, after having relayed WZBK for a while, has been relaying WKNE-HD3, since December 2018.

References

External links

Monadnock Broadcasting Group

KNE
Hot adult contemporary radio stations in the United States
Keene, New Hampshire
Radio stations established in 1964
1964 establishments in New Hampshire